Choy Yuk-Ling, better known as Bao Choy, is a journalist and television producer in Hong Kong, best known for her work on and subsequent arrest for Radio Television Hong Kong (RTHK)'s Hong Kong Connection. In the making of the investigative documentary  titled 7.21 Who Owns the Truth? for Hong Kong Connection, Choy requested and obtained publicly available vehicle registration records to identify suspects involved in the Yuen Long mob attack during the 2019–2020 Hong Kong protests. She was arrested in November 2020 for allegedly violating the Road Traffic Ordinance in Hong Kong for falsely declaring her intention to access the database and was found guilty and fined on two charges in April 2021.

Career 
Choy joined Radio Television Hong Kong (RTHK) in 2007 working on multiple TV programmes. In 2016, she joined the Hong Kong-based investigative news agency FactWire as a founding editorial member but returned to RTHK in 2018 as a freelance producer for Hong Kong Connection.

She was suspended from working at RTHK after her arrest in November 2020. In 2021, Choy was awarded membership in the Neiman Fellowship Class of 2022 at Harvard University.

Arrest and charges 
In the making of 7.21 Who Owns the Truth?, an episode of RTHK's Hong Kong Connection documentary programme, Choy examined the 21 July 2019 Yuen Long mob attack where suspected gang members attacked citizens indiscriminately. Using CCTV footage, Choy and colleagues identified a few vehicles parked near the suspected gang members and issued a request to use the publicly available vehicle registration database to identify the car owners. The episode aired in July 2020, with narration stating that according to the database, the vehicles suspected of having transported weapons for the mobs were linked to local village representatives.

In early November 2020, Choy was arrested for allegedly misstating her intention to obtain vehicle licence plate information.  Charged with two counts of making false statements under the Road Traffic Ordinance, Choy first appeared in court on November 10. She pleaded not guilty.

According to the Principal Magistrate, Ivy Chui, the Road Traffic Ordinance could only approve the public access to the database for reasons: transport or traffic-related matters, legal matters, or for vehicle purchases. Not given a category for journalistic reasons, Choy declared in her online application that her intention to obtain the vehicle registration records was for "transport or traffic-related matters." The charge was criticized by the Hong Kong Journalists Association who stated that checking publicly accessible databases, including vehicle registration records, has been a common investigative tool in Hong Kong. It was also argued by Choy's lawyer during trials that Choy's use of the database was indeed a "transport or traffic-related matter" since the vehicles were suspected of transporting weapons on the night of the mob attack.

Facing a maximum sentence of six months' imprisonment, on April 22, 2021, Choy was convicted by the West Kowloon Magistrates’ Courts and handed a HK$6,000 (around US$770) fine over the two charges.

In November 2022, judge Alex Lee rejected Choy's appeal. In January 2023, the Court of Final Appeal allowed her appeal, and scheduled to hear her case on May 3.

References 

Living people
Hong Kong journalists
Year of birth missing (living people)